Margaret of Geneva (1180?–1252), was a countess of Savoy by marriage to Thomas I of Savoy. She was the daughter of William I, Count of Geneva, and Beatrice de Faucigny (1160–1196).

Life
Margaret was supposed to become the third wife of Philip II of France. However, when her father was escorting her to France in May 1195, Thomas I of Savoy carried her off. Attracted by her beauty, Count Thomas then married her himself, claiming that Philip II was already married (the French King had married Ingeborg of Denmark in 1193 but had repudiated her soon thereafter). Margaret's father fell sick and died after the wedding, and her mother died the following year.

After her death, she was buried at Hautecombe Abbey in Savoy.

Issue
The children of Marguerite and Thomas I of Savoy were:

Amadeus IV of Savoy (1197–1253)
Humbert (d. 1223)
Thomas, Count of Flanders (c. 1199-1259), count in Piedmont
Aimone (d. 1237), Lord of Chablais
William of Savoy (d. 1239), Bishop of Valence and Dean of Vienne
Peter II of Savoy (1203-1268), Earl of Richmond and later disputed count of Savoy
Philip I of Savoy (1207-1285), archbishop of Lyon, later Count Palatine of Burgundy by marriage
Boniface of Savoy, Archbishop of Canterbury (c. 1207-1270)
Beatrice of Savoy (1205 – 4 January 1267), wife of Ramon Berenguer IV, Count of Provence. 
Margaret of Savoy (d. 1273), wife of Hartmann I of Kyburg

References

Sources

House of Geneva
Countesses of Savoy
1180s births
1252 deaths
Burials at Hautecombe Abbey
Year of birth uncertain
12th-century French women
12th-century French people
13th-century French women
13th-century French people